Shaun Evans (born 21 October 1987) is an Australian association football referee.

He began officiating in the A-League as an assistant referee in 2008, and was promoted to referee in 2012. He was named as a full-time Football Australia referee in 2016, and the following year he was named on the FIFA International Referees List. He was voted Referee of the Year in the 2018–19 A-League.

Evans refereed in the 2019 A-League Grand Final, the 2021 FFA Cup Final and the 2022 AFC Cup Final. He has also officiated in the Chinese Super League and Indonesian Liga 1, as well as the 2014 Chinese FA Cup Final. He was selected as a Video Assistant Referee at the 2022 FIFA World Cup.

Biography
Born in the state of Victoria, Evans began officiating in the A-League as an assistant referee in 2008, being promoted to referee for 2012–13. In August 2016, Football Australia CEO David Gallop named him as one of three full-time professional referees, alongside Jarred Gillett and Chris Beath and replacing the retired Ben Williams. Before this promotion, he was a bricklayer. At the start of 2017, he was one of five Australian male referees put on FIFA's list of international referees. He officiated an international friendly between Uzbekistan and Lebanon in November 2018.

Evans refereed four Chinese Super League games in 2013, and the first leg of the Chinese FA Cup final in 2014. In 2017, he was enlisted to officiate in the Indonesian Liga 1. Evans was voted Referee of the Year in the 2018–19 A-League, meaning he was named for the Grand Final.

In October 2016, Evans gave Jack Clisby of Western Sydney Wanderers FC a yellow card and not a red for a foul that injured Sergio Cirio of Adelaide United FC. Adelaide chairman Greg Griffen wrote to Football Australia requesting that Evans never referee their matches again, a demand that was rejected.

In February 2022, Evans was in charge of the 2021 FFA Cup Final, which Melbourne Victory FC won 2–1 against Central Coast Mariners FC. Later that month, a Football Australia review found that Evans made two incorrect decisions regarding penalty kicks, both of which went in favour of Melbourne City FC, who defeated the Mariners 3–2. In October, he led an all-Australian officiating team for the AFC Cup final in Kuala Lumpur.

Evans was selected as one of 24 Video Assistant Referees at the 2022 FIFA World Cup in Qatar.

References

1987 births
Living people
Sportsmen from Victoria (Australia)
Australian bricklayers
Australian soccer referees
A-League Men referees